Longuefuye is a former commune in the Mayenne department in north-western France. On 1 January 2019, it was merged into the new commune Gennes-Longuefuye.

See also
Communes of the Mayenne department

References

Former communes of Mayenne
Populated places disestablished in 2019